Prashant Ranyal is an Indian television and film actor. He was seen in the TV shows Kasamh Se and Parvarrish – Kuchh Khattee Kuchh Meethi. He made his film debut in 2011 with the Bollywood film Love U...Mr. Kalakaar!.

References 

Living people
Male actors in Hindi cinema
Indian male television actors
Year of birth missing (living people)
Place of birth missing (living people)